Within the city-operated parks system of New York City, there are many parks that are either named after individuals of Hispanic and Latin American descent, or contain monuments relating to the cultures of Spain and Latin America.

Manhattan

Anibal Aviles Playground
 Emilio Barbosa Memorial (Bennett Park)
Duarte Square
 Minerva Bernardino Greenstreet
 Quisqueya Playground
Benito Juárez statue, Bryant Park
José Bonifácio de Andrada statue, Bryant Park
 Jose de San Martin monument, Central Park South
 Jose Marti monument, Central Park South
 Simon Bolivar monument, Central Park South
 General Jose Artigas monument, Spring Street Park
 Ilka Tanya Payan Triangle
La Plaza Cultural (community garden)
 Campos Community Garden
 Dias y Flores Garden

Bronx

 Arcilla Playground
 Astin Jacobo Field
 Carlos J. Lozada Playground
 Captain Rivera Playground
 Happy Land Memorial
 Parque de los Ninos
 Oscar Comras Mall (Pelham Parkway at Boston Road)
 Yolanda Garcia Park
 P.O. Serrano Playground
 Puerto Rican Sun sculpture (Fox Playground)
 Jardin de la Roca
 El Coqui Garden
 La Finca del Sur
Roberto Clemente State Park, operated by New York State Parks

Brooklyn

 Eugenio Maria de Hostos Playground
Martinez Playground
 Jaime Campiz Playground
 Roberto Clemente Ballfield
Maria Hernandez Park
 P.O. Reinaldo Salgado Playground

Queens

 Captain Mario Fajardo Playground
 SSG Patbouvier E. “Bobby” Ortiz Triangle
 Manuel De Dios Unanue Triangle
 Park of the Americas
 Flight 587 Memorial

Staten Island

 Lopez Playground

References

Squares in New York City
Monuments and memorials in New York City
Hispanic and Latino American culture in New York City
Puerto Rican culture in New York City
New York City parks-related lists